Greenbelt Alliance is a San Francisco Bay Area nonprofit organization founded to help the region handle a climate change. The organization's mission is to protect precious open spaces while focusing equitable, climate-smart growth within existing urban areas.

History 

Greenbelt Alliance was founded in 1958 as an organization called Citizens for Regional Recreation and Parks. One of its first campaigns was helping to halt the filling of San Francisco Bay for development. In 1969, the organization was renamed People for Open Space to reflect the organization's additional interest in preserving ranch lands, agricultural lands, and wildlife preserves. In the 1970s, People for Open Space helped to establish a public park district called the Mid-Peninsula Regional Open Space District (1972), as well as Suisun Marsh (1974). The organization also involved in campaigning for a regional government for the Bay Area, but was defeated in Sacramento by one vote. In 1976, People for Open Space added the goal of establishing a permanent regional greenbelt to its agenda, and in 1984 created a group called Greenbelt Congress to work on open space protection through activism and grassroots organizing.

In 1987, Greenbelt Congress and People for Open Space merged to become Greenbelt Alliance, and established a dual focus of grassroots activism and policy research. Greenbelt Alliance expanded outside San Francisco with a field office in the South Bay in 1988. In 1995, East Bay and Sonoma-Marin field offices opened, and in 2001, a Solano-Napa office opened in response to growth along the Interstate 80 corridor between San Francisco and Sacramento.

In the 1990s and 2000s, Greenbelt Alliance was involved in stopping sprawl development proposals and protecting Pleasanton Ridge (1993), Bear Creek Redwoods (1999), and Cowell Ranch/John Marsh SHP (2002) as state parks or open space preserves. It helped to create the Santa Clara Valley Open Space Authority in 1994, and was part of defeating a freeway proposal called the Mid-State Toll Road in 1995.

See also 
 Climate resilience
Greenbelt
 Land use
 Mixed-use development
 New Urbanism
 Transit-oriented development
 Urban planning
 Urban sprawl
 Walkability

References

External links
 Greenbelt Alliance
Resilience Playbook

Organizations established in 1958
Environmental organizations based in the San Francisco Bay Area
Non-profit organizations based in San Francisco
Climate change organizations based in the United States
1958 establishments in California